Samed Baždar (Serbian Cyrillic: Самед Баждар; born 31 January 2004) is a Serbian professional footballer who plays as a forward for Partizan in the Serbian SuperLiga.

Club career

Partizan

A graduate of the club's youth academy, Baždar made his professional debut for the club on 15 May 2021, coming on as a 79th-minute substitute for Miloš Jojić in a 3-0 victory over Voždovac. 

Baždar scored his first goal for Partizan on 9 July 2022 in a 4-0 away win against Javor in the first game of the season. He scored his third goal of the season on 2 October in Derby of Serbia in a 4-1 win against Vojvodina. In the last moments of the game, Baždar took the ball away from his rival in the middle of the field, he himself ran towards the rival's goal and set the final score. Baždar was the scorer again on October 30 in a 4-0 victory over Radnički Niš. It was the 85th minute of the game when Bibras Natcho played through the young Baždar, and the talented youngster from the school of steamroller placed the ball nicely in the net and increased to a big 4-0.

References

External links
 Profile at FK Partizan website

2004 births
Living people
Sportspeople from Novi Pazar
FK Partizan players
Serbian SuperLiga players
Association football forwards
Serbian footballers